Epallage is a genus of damselflies in the family Euphaeidae. It contains one species, E. fatime.

References

Euphaeidae
Zygoptera genera